The following is a list of the episodes for the ABC Family drama Wildfire. Episode summaries are from Genevieve Cortese Fan.com

Series overview

Episodes

Season 1 (2005)

Season 2 (2006)

Season 3 (2007)

Season 4 (2008)

External links

Wildfire